The 1949–50 Swedish Division I season was the sixth season of Swedish Division I. Sodertalje SK defeated Hammarby IF in the league final.

Regular season

Northern Group

Southern Group

Final
Södertälje SK – Hammarby IF 3–2, 3–2 OT

External links
 1949–50 season

Swedish Division I seasons
1949–50 in Swedish ice hockey leagues
Swedish